MAIF may refer to:

 Maryland Automobile Insurance Fund, American insurance company
 Mjällby AIF, Swedish football club